The Ruins is a 2008 natural horror film directed by Carter Smith and written by Scott B. Smith (no relation), based on his 2006 novel of the same name. The film stars Jonathan Tucker, Jena Malone, Shawn Ashmore, Laura Ramsey, and Joe Anderson. The story follows a pair of couples on vacation in Mexico who join a tourist to visit a remote Mayan ruin, that unfortunately is inhabited by a carnivorous vine growth. Stuart Cornfeld, Jeremy Kramer, and Chris Bender produce, with Ben Stiller serving as an executive producer.

The Ruins was released by DreamWorks/Paramount Distribution on 4 April 2008. The film received mixed reviews from critics, and was a box-office bomb; only earning $22.9 million at the worldwide box office against a budget of $25 million.

Plot
Two young American couples — Jeff, Amy, Eric, and Stacy 
go on vacation to Mexico. They meet Mathias, a German tourist, who is looking for his brother Heinrich. His last known location is an archaeological dig at a remote Mayan ruin in the jungle. They are also joined by Dimitri, Mathias' friend. The group reaches the ruins of a Mayan temple, and are confronted by Mayan villagers armed with knives, bows, arrows, and a gun. Mathias tries to explain their purpose, but the villagers do not understand Spanish or English. When Amy accidentally steps on some vines, the villagers become extremely agitated. Dimitri approaches the villagers, hoping to appease them, but they shoot and kill him. The rest of the group flees up the steps of the ruins.

At the top, they find an abandoned camp and a shaft in the center. They hear a phone ringing from somewhere inside the ruins. The group lowers Mathias down the shaft with a rope, but it breaks and Mathias falls, becoming paralyzed. Amy and Jeff descend the temple steps hoping to reason with the Mayans, but to no success. In anger, Amy throws a clump of vines which hit a young boy, whom the Mayans promptly kill. They realize the Mayans are afraid of the vines, and will not let them leave as they have all touched them. Later, Stacy and Amy descend the shaft to rescue Mathias.

The next morning, Stacy sees a tendril of vine has crept into a wound on her leg. The vines have also wrapped themselves around Mathias' lower legs and eaten them down to the bone. Eric and Jeff are barely able to remove the vines from Stacy, but cannot get them off of Mathias. The phone is heard again from deep in the shaft so Stacy and Amy descend again. In a small, vine-covered room, the two find the body of the young archaeologist, Heinrich's friend, and a broken phone. They then realize that the ringing sound was made by the flowers of the vine. As Amy touches one flower, the vines attack and the two barely escape.

As Mathias' condition worsens, Jeff amputates his legs to avoid an infection. Stacy becomes jealous at Eric comforting a distraught Amy and accuses them of having sex. While the four argue, the vines suffocate Mathias.

In the morning Eric brings Amy and Jeff into the tent and tells Stacy to show them the vines underneath her skin. Eric uses a knife to remove the vine from her leg and spine. Stacy tries to take the knife, claiming that the vines are in her head. The rest of the group watches her as a vine moves under the skin in her forehead, revealing that her fears are true.

The next morning, Stacy awakens and leaves the tent where the rest of the group is sleeping. She finds a backpack, which contains a knife. Jeff hears moans coming from outside and goes to see what is going on, and finds Stacey covered in open wounds slicing her body open to get the vines out.  He touches her and she flails the knife at him, slicing his palm. Eric also tries to calm her, but she spins around and fatally stabs him in the chest. While the rest try to restrain Stacy, Eric is dragged away by the vines. Overcome with remorse, Stacy begs Amy to kill her, and Jeff kills her as an act of mercy.

Jeff makes a plan for Amy to escape. He smears Stacy's blood all over her, then carries her to the bottom of the temple and lays her on the ground. He then provokes and berates the Mayans, drawing their attention away from Amy. The Mayans eventually shoot Jeff with arrows. Amy gets up and runs through the jungle with the Mayans chasing after her. Jeff is killed by the Mayan leader with a gunshot to the head. After escaping from the Mayans, Amy reaches the Jeep and manages to drive away.
 
After Amy's escape, Dimitri's two Greek friends are seen walking through the woods and come up to the temple, looking for him.

Alternate ending
In the unrated version, as Amy manages to drive away in the jeep, a close shot of her face is shown crawling with moving vines, indicating she too is infected. An extended version of this ending exists as a deleted scene. Following the previous scene, a caretaker is seen walking among the headstones in a cemetery sometimes later, whistling "Frère Jacques". When he hears the same tune coming from a grave, he goes forward to investigate and the camera follows, revealing the grave to be Amy's and several red flowers around the headstone. As the caretaker reaches for one, the music surges and the scene cuts to black.

Director Carter Smith told an interviewer, "We shot a bunch of different stuff to see which one would work best with the finished film. There's a testing process you go through with a studio movie and as frustrating as it can be, it also really gives you a good sense of how an audience feels about an ending. Our final decision was informed by what audiences found the most satisfying after watching a really punishing film. I love the ending of the book, but if the movie had ended the same way, the audience would have wanted to kill themselves."

Cast
 Jonathan Tucker as Jeff
 Jena Malone as Amy "Ame"
 Laura Ramsey as Stacy "Stace"
 Shawn Ashmore as Eric
 Joe Anderson as Mathias
 Sergio Calderón as Lead Mayan
 Jesse Ramirez as Mayan Bowman
 Balder Moreno as Mayan Horseman
 Dimitri Baveas as Dimitri
 Patricio Almeida Rodriguez as Taxi Driver
 Luis Antonio Ramos as Mayan Rifleman
 Walter Quispe as Mayan Rifleman
 Pauline Whyman as Wailing Woman
 Chris Argirousis as Greek
 Alexander Gregory as Greek
 Michelle Atkinson as Archeologist
 Bar Paly as Archeologist
 Jordan Patrick Smith as Heinrich
 Karen Strassman as Additional Vine Vocal (voice)

Production
The shooting of this film took place in Queensland, Australia. According to The Miami Herald, "Smith was two-thirds done with the book when Ben Stiller's production company, Red Hour Films, bought the screen rights based on an outline. 'They told me they wanted me to write the screenplay, too,' Smith says. 'So while I was writing the last third of the book, I already knew I'd be adapting it for the movies.'"

Director Carter Smith said, "If the audience is going to buy that this vine moves and can get into your body and all that, the world of the film has to be absolutely realistic. We took elements from lots of different real-life plants when designing our vine. It's in practically every single shot in the film after the characters reach the hill, so it has to look like something that could really be growing there. But it also has to look menacing once you realize what it is capable of doing."

Release
The teaser trailer was released in December 2007. A red band trailer was aired on 21 February 2008. It was released on 20 June 2008 in the UK.

Box office
The Ruins was released in the US on 4 April 2008. In the US box office it debuted at #5 making $8,003,421. After 3 weeks it exited the top 10. It has grossed $17,432,844 domestically and $22,818,256 worldwide.

Critical reception

On review aggregator Rotten Tomatoes, The Ruins holds an approval rating of 48%, based on 95 reviews, and an average rating of 5.35/10. The site's consensus reads, "Despite a solid cast and truly frightening source material, The Ruins flounders, thanks to a weak script and an excess of gore." On Metacritic, the film has a weighted average score of 44 out of 100, based on 15 critics, indicating "mixed or average reviews".

James Berardinelli gave the film three stars out of four, saying, "The Ruins does what a good psychological horror movie should do: rely on tension rather than gore to achieve its aims. This bleak, edgy motion picture isn't concerned with appealing to the masses that flock to multiplexes to enjoy the spatterings of the latest serial slasher or the hollow weirdness of a PG-13 ghost story."

The Miami Herald gave a mixed review: "The Ruins is, with one major caveat, about as good an adaptation of Scott Smith's bestselling novel as Hollywood was ever going to make...except for a stray shot here and there – like a glimpse of the vine's tendrils making off with a severed foot – the great potential for unintentional guffaws is mostly avoided."

Home media
The Ruins was released on DVD on 8 July 2008 in both R-rated and unrated versions. It debuted at #4 on the DVD Sales Chart, selling 189,128 copies. As of 3 August 2008, The Ruins has sold 343,414 copies. The R-rated edition includes a commentary by director Carter Smith and editor Jeff Betancourt, three featurettes (Making The Ruins, Creeping Death, Building The Ruins), additional scenes (Rain, Celebration, Going Over The Escape Plan, Alternate Ending), and trailers. The unrated edition includes the theatrical cut and extra material, and also an alternate ending and optional commentary with additional scenes.  An unrated Blu-ray Disc edition is also available with identical features.

References

External links
 
 
 
 
 Human Lab Rat (Viral marketing Justin.tv channel)

2008 films
Australian natural horror films
DreamWorks Pictures films
Spyglass Entertainment films
Films about plants
Films about vacationing
Films set in Mexico
2008 horror films
Films scored by Graeme Revell
Red Hour Productions films
Films based on American horror novels
American natural horror films
American survival films
American supernatural horror films
Australian supernatural horror films
American body horror films
Adventure horror films
Films shot at Village Roadshow Studios
Films set in jungles
Works by Scott Smith
2000s English-language films
2000s American films